The Matrix Revolutions: Limited Edition (2-CD Set) is a score album to the 2003 film The Matrix Revolutions by Don Davis. It was officially released on February 25, 2014. This release includes almost the entire film's score on two discs.

Track listing

Composed, conducted and orchestrated by Don Davis. Performed by The Hollywood Studio Symphony.

References

The Matrix (franchise) albums
2014 soundtrack albums
2010s film soundtrack albums
La-La Land Records soundtracks
Film scores
Don Davis (composer) soundtracks